Johnny Goodchild (2 January 1939 – 25 August 2011) was a professional footballer who scored 71 goals from 238 appearances in the Football League playing as an inside forward for Sunderland, Brighton & Hove Albion, York City and Darlington.

Career
Goodchild was born in Sherburn Hill, County Durham. He worked as a miner and played for Ludworth Juniors before signing for Sunderland. He scored on his first-team debut, on 4 September 1957 in a 3–2 home defeat of Leicester City in the First Division, and produced 16 goals the following season. He then fell out of favour, and, despite scoring a hat-trick away at Leeds United in February 1961, his first game of the 1960–61 season, never appeared for the club again. Goodchild remembers "thinking to myself that if I couldn't get into the team after scoring a hat-trick away from home, I'd be on the transfer list at the end of the season. That's exactly what happened."

He joined Second Division club Brighton & Hove Albion, and in his first season with the club, was their joint-top scorer (alongside Bobby Laverick and Tony Nicholas) with 10 goals in all competitions. Two years later, by which time the club had been twice relegated and were now playing in Division Four, he was top scorer on his own, with 15 goals in all competitions. In 1964–65, Goodchild was one of six goalscorers to reach double figures as Albion won the Fourth Division title.

He returned to the north of England in 1966, spending a season with York City and a brief spell with Darlington.

Goodchild was a keen cricketer. He first played for his village side, in Littletown, at 14, and appeared for Durham Second XI in 1959.
He played cricket for many years in the Durham County League for Ushaw Moor CC.

References

1939 births
2011 deaths
Footballers from County Durham
English footballers
Association football forwards
Sunderland A.F.C. players
Brighton & Hove Albion F.C. players
York City F.C. players
Darlington F.C. players
Goole Town F.C. players
English Football League players